Lucas Bongane Thwala (born 19 October 1981 in Nelspruit) is a retired South African football defender who last played for SuperSport United in the Premier Soccer League.

Thwala was born in Jeppe's Reef near Nelspruit.

References

External links

1981 births
Living people
South African soccer players
Association football defenders
South Africa international soccer players
Orlando Pirates F.C. players
Platinum Stars F.C. players
2005 CONCACAF Gold Cup players
2010 FIFA World Cup players
SuperSport United F.C. players